The Capitol Mall or Capitol Mall Boulevard is a major street and landscaped parkway in the state capital city of Sacramento, California. It connects the city of West Sacramento in Yolo County to Downtown Sacramento. Capitol Mall begins at the eastern approach to the Tower Bridge, and runs east to 10th Street and the California State Capitol.

Route description
Capitol Mall begins at the eastern end of Tower Bridge, which crosses the Sacramento River to West Sacramento. It runs eastward past the Riverfront Promenade park, and over the Interstate 5 to the 1860s landmark California State Capitol building and parks. There is no direct connection to Interstate 5, so drivers will have to use other routes.

Some of Sacramento's major businesses and law firms are located on the Capitol Mall. Due to Sacramento's street grid system downtown, Capitol Mall would theoretically be called "M Street" if it used the grid system's conventions.

The Capitol Mall was previously part of State Route 275, but was relinquished to the city in January 2006.

Capitol Mall Boulevard landmarks
Landmarks on the Capitol Mall, from the west (Tower Bridge and Sacramento River) to the east (California State Capitol), include:

1 Capitol Mall

Located at 1 Capitol Mall, Drexel University Sacramento is the California campus of renowned Drexel University, based in Philadelphia. It is located near the iconic Tower Bridge, between the Sacramento River and the Mall's crossing over Interstate 5.

100 Capitol Mall
Located at 100 Capitol Mall near the Tower Bridge, the 242 room 'Embassy Suites Sacramento - Riverfront Promenade' is a hotel popular with tourists, due to its proximity to Old Town in the Old Sacramento State Historic Park and the Riverfront Promenade park along the Sacramento River.

300 Capitol Mall
Located at the gateway to downtown, the busy intersection of 3rd Street and Capitol Mall, 300 Capitol Mall stands 18 stories high with 383,238 square feet of rentable area.  The tower was designed by Daniel, Mann, Johnson & Mendenhall (DMJM) and completed in 1984.

301 Capitol Mall

301 Capitol Mall is the site of the former home of the Sacramento Union newspaper. Construction began here in 2006 for The Towers on Capitol Mall I & II, two planned 53-story and massive  mixed-use towers. The project had been on hold since January 2007 due to liens being filed against developer.

400 Capitol Mall — Wells Fargo Center

Located at 400 Capitol Mall, the 'Wells Fargo Center' is currently the tallest building in Sacramento. The skyscraper won the BOMA Building of the Year award in 1994. A museum is located in the lobby, dedicated to the history of Wells Fargo Bank in the Sacramento area. Located within the Wells Fargo Center: Il Fornaio, a popular restaurant; and Price Waterhouse Coopers, a major tenant.

500 Capitol Mall -- Bank of the West Tower

The building consists of a 5-story atrium/lobby, ground floor retail, office space, and a 2-level penthouse restaurant or meeting facility. The structure has a steel frame and features a granite curtain wall with stone-on-precast and stone-on-truss panels on the exterior. The building, opened for business and welcomed its first tenant on May 26, 2009.

California State Capitol

At the eastern terminus of the Capitol Mall, the landmark California State Capitol stands. It and the surrounding grounds contain the California State Capitol Museum. The Beaux-Arts and Neoclassical style building with dome was under construction from 1860 to 1874. The capitol and grounds are a California Historical Landmark, a National Historic Landmark District, and on the National Register of Historic Places in Sacramento County, California.

Public transportation

Sacramento Regional Transit District—RT serves public transport to/from and along the Capitol Mall. RT serves the city of Sacramento, and much of the northern portion of Sacramento County.

Light rail
RT has two light rail stops located on the Capitol Mall. The 7th & Capitol Stop is only for southbound trains, while the 8th & Capitol Stop is only for northbound trains. The two stops serve all three RT light rail routes: the Gold Line, Blue Line, and Green Line.

Buses 
There are also bus stops located on the Capitol Mall operated by RT, with service between 5:00 a.m. and 9:00 p.m. daily. The bus fleet is powered by compressed natural gas.

Major intersections

See also
Old Sacramento State Historic Park — 2 blocks north of the Mall
Crocker Art Museum — 2 blocks south of the Mall
Sacramento Convention Center Complex — with Community Center Theatre
List of tallest buildings in Sacramento

References 

emporis.com
rsconstruction.com
cbre.com
skyscraperpage.com

External links 
Sacramento Capitol Mall Design Competition — by the City of Sacramento and the American Institute of Architects.

Transportation in Sacramento, California
Streets in Sacramento County, California
Landmarks in Sacramento, California